Leucosporidium is a genus of fungi found in the family Leucosporidiaceae. It contains 5 species.

References

External links

Basidiomycota genera
Leucosporidiales